The second season of the reality series The Osbournes premiered on MTV on December 3, 2002 and concluded on August 12, 2003, consisting a total of 20 episodes. This season was split into two parts with a total of 10 episodes for each part. The series follows the lives of Ozzy Osbourne and his family. The DVD release billed the first half as The Osbournes - The 2nd Season while the remaining 10 episodes were billed as The Osbournes 2 1/2.

Episodes

References

External links 
 

2002 American television seasons
2003 American television seasons
Split television seasons